Megasternini is a tribe of water scavenger beetles in the family Hydrophilidae. There are at least 70 described species in Megasternini.

Genera
 Agna Smetana, 1978
 Cercyon Leach, 1817
 Cryptopleurum Mulsant, 1844
 Cycrillum Knisch, 1921
 Deltostethus Sharp, 1882
 Megasternum Mulsant, 1844
 Oosternum Sharp, 1882
 Paraoosternum Scott, 1913
 Pelosoma Mulsant, 1844
 Tectosternum Balfour-Browne, 1958

References

 Hansen, Michael (1999). World Catalogue of Insects, volume 2: Hydrophiloidea (s. str.) (Coleoptera), 416.

Further reading

 Arnett, R. H. Jr., M. C. Thomas, P. E. Skelley and J. H. Frank. (eds.). (21 June 2002). American Beetles, Volume II: Polyphaga: Scarabaeoidea through Curculionoidea. CRC Press LLC, Boca Raton, Florida .
 
 Richard E. White. (1983). Peterson Field Guides: Beetles. Houghton Mifflin Company.

Hydrophilidae
Beetle tribes